Vincenzo "Vince" Briganti (born 5 January 1947) is an Italo-Belgian former football player and manager.

Personal life
Four years after his birth in Terni, Italy, Vince Briganti's father moved to Belgium to find work in the mining area. One year later also the rest of the family moved to Genk.

Briganti is married and became father of two sons, Fabrizio and Lorenzo.

Career
In the 1970s Briganti played for third-tier team KFC Winterslag. In that period Robert Waseige was trainer of the club from Belgian Limburg. In a couple of years, the club promoted from Third to First Division.

Afterwards he achieved a trainer's certificate and became Waseige's assistant trainer at Winterslag. Later hij also became head coach of the club multiple times, often after another trainer was fired. After a couple of years at Winterslag Briganti trained the first teams of the clubs KSC Hasselt, Bilzerse VV, KFC Zwarte Leeuw and K. Stade Leuven.

After a short career as trainer Briganti became football teacher at Bloso. He combined that function with scouting tasks for Waseige, who assigned him as his assistant for the Belgium national team. In 2001, he even became the factual trainer of the Belgian Red Devils for a friendly match against Czech Republic (a 1–1 draw) as stand-in for Waseige who underwent heart surgery; he trained the outfield players while Jacky Munaron trained the goalkeepers. With Briganti as assistant trainer, Belgium reached the second stage at the 2002 FIFA World Cup. Later, he also became Marc Wilmots's assistant for a short time with Sint-Truidense V.V.

References

1947 births
Living people
People from Terni
Italian emigrants to Belgium
Belgian footballers
Belgian football managers
Belgian Pro League players
K.R.C. Genk managers
K.R.C. Genk players
Association footballers not categorized by position
Sportspeople from the Province of Terni
Sportspeople from Genk
Footballers from Limburg (Belgium)
Footballers from Umbria